Subhro Bandopadhyay (pen name of Subhransu Banerjee) is an Indian poet who writes in Bengali. He won Sahitya Akademi's Yuva Puraskar, (awarded by Govt. of India to young writers of the country) 2013 for his poetry book Bouddho Lekhomala O Onnyano Shraman.

Biography 
Subhro was born in Kolkata, 1978. He studied Biological Sciences then shifted to Spanish language for his keen interest in literature. He is a young polyglot writer who speaks four languages including Spanish and English. He has authored 5 poetry books, a novel and a biography on Pablo Neruda, all of them in Bengali. His third collection of poems was short listed for the Sanskriti Awards for Literature in 2006. He has received the Ruy de Clavijo scholarship from Casa Asia, Govt. of Spain in 2007. His fourth collection of poems chitabaagh shahor which is written at a residency programme with I Beca Internacional Antonio Machado for poetic creation (awarded jointly by Ministry of Culture, Govt. of Spain and Fundación Antonio Machado in 2008)  in Spain the book is published under the title La ciudad leopardo, He has translated several contemporary Spanish authors into Bengali and made the maiden collection of contemporary Bengali poetry in Spanish which is published in Spain  and in Chile. In 2014 the translation of his Bouddho Lekhomala O Onnyano Shraman is published in Spain  under the title Poemas metálicos. He along with four editors, edits the magazine Kaurab. He teaches Spanish at Instituto Cervantes New Delhi.

References

Living people
Bengali writers
Bengali poets
Poets from West Bengal
Indian male poets
20th-century Indian poets
Year of birth missing (living people)
Recipients of the Sahitya Akademi Yuva Puraskar
Writers from Kolkata